Room No. 382 is a remix album by Miyavi released on December 24, 2008. The album contains songs varying from both his indie and major label career and are remixed by his former DJ TeddyLoid from his backup band the Kavki Boiz. It charted 127th on Oricon and 89th on Billboard Japan.

Track listing

References

2008 albums
Miyavi albums